Keelor is a surname. Notable people with the surname include:

Denzil Keelor (born 1933), Indian Air Force marshal
Greg Keelor (born 1954), Canadian singer-songwriter and musician
Trevor Keelor (1934–2002), Indian Air Force officer, brother of Denzil